Moisés Julio Blanchoud (September 4, 1923 – February 28, 2016) was an Argentine Prelate of the Catholic Church.  

Blanchoud was born in Esperanza, Argentina and was ordained a priest on December 14, 1947. Blanchoud was appointed auxiliary bishop of the Diocese of Río Cuarto as well as titular bishop Belali on February 13, 1960, and ordained April 24, 1960. Blanchoud was installed as bishop of the Diocese of Río Cuarto on March 7, 1963. Blanchoud was appointed to the Archdiocese of Salta on January 7, 1984, and retired from the diocese August 6, 1999. In October 2002 Blanchoud was appointed Apostolic Administrator of Archdiocese of Santa Fe de la Vera Cruz and resigned on March 30, 2003.

References

External links
Catholic-Hierarchy 
Salta Archdiocese

1923 births
2016 deaths
20th-century Roman Catholic bishops in Argentina
21st-century Roman Catholic bishops in Argentina
20th-century Roman Catholic titular bishops
Roman Catholic bishops of Villa de la Concepción del Río Cuarto
Roman Catholic archbishops of Salta
People from Esperanza, Santa Fe